is a village located in Nagano Prefecture, Japan. , the village had an estimated population of 1,275 in 712 households, and a population density of 12.1 persons per km².

Geography
Tenryū is located in mountainous far south of Nagano Prefecture on its border with Aichi Prefecture and Shizuoka Prefecture. The Tenryū River runs through the village, which is over 90% covered in mountains and forest. Hiraoka Dam is located within Tenryū.

Surrounding municipalities
Nagano Prefecture
 IIda
 Anan
 Yasuoka
Aichi Prefecture
Toyone
Shizuoka Prefecture
Hamamatsu

Climate
The town has a climate characterized by hot and humid summers, and cold winters (Köppen climate classification Cfa).  The average annual temperature in Tenryū is 13.3 °C. The average annual rainfall is 1964 mm with September as the wettest month. The temperatures are highest on average in August, at around 25.1 °C, and lowest in January, at around 1.9 °C.

Demographics
Per Japanese census data, the population of Tenryū has dropped rapidly over the past 70 years.

History
The area of present-day Tenryū was part of ancient Shinano Province. The village was established on September 30, 1956 by the merger of the villages of Hiraoka and Kamihara.

Education
Tenryū has one public elementary school and one public middle school operated by the village government, and one private elementary school and one private middle school. The village does not have a high school.

Transportation

Railway
 JR Tōkai – Iida Line
  -  -  -  -

Highway

References

External links
 
Official Website 

 
Villages in Nagano Prefecture